Sochi National Park (also Sochinsky National Park) is Russia's oldest national park, established on May 5, 1983. It is located in the Western Caucasus, near the city of Sochi, in Southern Russia.

Topography 
Sochi National Park covers  within the Western Caucasus World Heritage Site. The park occupies the Greater Sochi area, from the border with the Tuapsinsky District, between the mouths of Shepsi River and Magri River in the north-west, to the border with Abkhazia along the Psou River in the south-east, and between the Black Sea to the water divide crest of the Greater Caucasus.  Immediately to the north is the Caucasus Nature Reserve. The park does not include areas of settlement, such as the city of Sochi and various urban and rural settlements, nor does it include the area of the Caucasian Biosphere Reserve.

Persian leopard re-introduction
In 2009, a Persian leopard reintroduction center was created in Sochi National Park, where two male leopards from Turkmenistan have been kept since September 2009. Additionally, two female Persian leopards from Iran have been kept since May 2010. Their descendants will be released into the wild in the Caucasus Biosphere Reserve. In 2012, a pair of Persian leopards were brought to the Sochi National park from Portugal's Lisbon Zoo. In July 2013, the pair had a litter, the first Persian leopard cubs known to be born in Russia in 50 years. The cubs will be released into the wild after learning survival skills from their parents, according to Natalia Dronova, the WWF-Russia species coordinator.

See also
 Caucasus mixed forests
 Caucasian Wisent
 National parks of Russia
 Nature reserves of Russia (zapovedniks)

References

External links
 Ministry of Natural Resources of Russian Federation: Sochi National Park website - detailed park profile
 Map of Sochi National Park - ProtectedPlanet.net
 Tourism 
National parks of Russia 
Geography of Southern Russia 
Protected areas established in 1983 
Sochi 
Geography of Krasnodar Krai 
Tourist attractions in Krasnodar Krai  
and recreation map of national park Sochi